Earthen Fortification in Pungnap-dong, Seoul is a flat earthen wall built at the edge of the Han River in Korea. It has a circumference of 3.5 km. It is located in modern-day Pungnap-dong, Songpa-gu, Seoul. It used to be included in the neighboring city of Gwangju.  It has a long oval shape, spreading to north and south, and leaning slightly toward the east.  Based on research conducted during the Japanese occupation, it has been speculated that Pungnap Toseong was Hanam Wiryeseong, the first capital of Baekje.

Only 2.7 km of its walls remain. Including the west wall, which had been destroyed by flooding, its circumference reaches about 3.5 km and its area nearly 859,508 m2. After constructing this central part, the inner wall, mainly composed of sandy soil, grit, clayish soil and muddy soil, was set up by heaping earth at a slant. On the top of the last earthen layer of the inner wall, pebbles were laid in three layers and trimmed stones were piled up inside 1.5m high with mud prepared from natural soil, and by piling up the central part in trapezoid shape whose lower part is 7m wide and 5m high.

References

See also
 List of Baekje-related topics
 Baekje

Archaeological sites in South Korea
Historic Sites of South Korea
Castles in South Korea
Baekje
Songpa District